Nathan Zuntz (6 October 1847, in Bonn – 22 March 1920, in Berlin) was a German physiologist born in Bonn. He was a pioneer of modern altitude physiology and aviation medicine.

Academic career 
He studied medicine at the University of Bonn, where he was an assistant to Max Schultze. In 1868 he earned his doctorate, and following a study trip to Berlin, returned to Bonn in 1870 as an assistant to physiologist Eduard Pflüger. The following year he became a lecturer at the University of Bonn, and in 1872 was an honorary professor of physiology at the Landwirtschaftlichen Akademie at Poppelsdorf. From 1881 until his retirement in 1919, he was a professor at the Landwirtschaftliche Hochschule Berlin (Royal Agricultural College) in Berlin. In 1884, Nathan Zuntz was elected as member of the German Academy of Sciences Leopoldina.

Scientific investigations 
Zuntz was involved in many facets of physiological research, including metabolism, respiration and nutrition, and is well known for his work in high-altitude physiology. He conducted extensive research on the physiological changes in animals and humans in extreme conditions. Many of his field studies were conducted at Capanna Regina Margherita, a research station at the apex of Monte Rosa, Italy. In 1902 with his assistant Hermann von Schrötter and meteorologists Arthur Berson and Reinhard Süring, he made two high-altitude balloon ascents in which they reached an altitude of 5000 meters. In 1910 Zuntz participated in a scientific expedition to Pico de Teide in the Canary Islands with Schrötter and physiologists Arnold Durig (1872-1961) and Joseph Barcroft (1872-1947).

He published a number of articles on high-altitude medicine, and one of his better known works was Höhenklima und Bergwanderungen in ihrer Wirkung auf den Menschen (High-Altitude Climate and Mountaineering and their Effect on Humans). In 1885 with August Julius Geppert (1856-1937), he created the Zuntz-Geppert respiratory apparatus, and for field studies Zuntz invented a portable Gasuhr (dry gas measuring device). In 1889 he constructed an early treadmill (Laufband), and in 1914 added an X-ray apparatus to the machine in order to observe cardiac changes during exercise. In addition, he opened the first laboratory dedicated to sports medicine in Germany (1911).

Selected publications 
 Der Stoffwechsel des Pferdes bei Ruhe und Arbeit (The metabolism of the horse at rest and work), 1889 (with C. Lehmann and O. Hagemann) 
 Studien zu einer Physiologie des Marsches (Studies on physiology of marches) Berlin, 1901 (with W. Schumburg) 
 Ergebnisse zweier Ballonfahrten zu physiologischen Zwecken (Results of two balloon rides for physiological purposes) Pflügers Archiv 92 (1902), 479-520 (with H. von Schrötter) 
 Höhenklima und Bergwanderungen in ihrer Wirkung auf den Menschen. Ergebnisse experimenteller Forschungen im Hochgebirge und Laboratorium (High-altitude climate and mountaineering and their effect on humans. Results of experimental research in the high mountains and the laboratory), 1906 (with Adolf Loewy, F. Müller and W. Caspari)  
 Lehrbuch der Physiologie des Menschen (Textbook of human physiology), 1909 (with A. Loewy)
 Zur Physiologie und Hygiene der Luftfahrt (The physiology and hygiene involving aviation), 1912

References
 Cat Inist (biography of Nathan Zuntz)
 "This article incorporates information based on a translation of an equivalent article at the German Wikipedia".

Notes

External links 
 Biography, bibliography and links to online-sources in the Virtual Laboratory of the Max Planck Institute for the History of Science

German physiologists
University of Bonn alumni
19th-century German Jews
Physicians from Bonn
1847 births
1920 deaths
Members of the German Academy of Sciences Leopoldina